This list of museums in Lancashire, England contains museums which are defined for this context as institutions (including nonprofit organizations, government entities, and private businesses) that collect and care for objects of cultural, artistic, scientific, or historical interest and make their collections or related exhibits available for public viewing. Also included are non-profit art galleries and university art galleries.  Museums that exist only in cyberspace (i.e., virtual museums) are not included.

Defunct museums
Lewis Textile Museum, Blackburn, closed in 2006, collections now part of Cottontown at Blackburn Museum and Art Gallery
 Mid Pennine Gallery, Burnley, closed in 2010
National Football Museum, Preston, closed in 2010 and will reopen in 2011 in Manchester
 Steamtown Carnforth, Carnforth, closed in 1997

See also
 :Category:Tourist attractions in Lancashire

References

 Lancashire County: Museums Service

 
Lancashire
Museums